Khanqah (also Romanized as Khānqāh, Khāngāh, and Khūngeh) is a village in Chamsangar Rural District, Papi District, Khorramabad County, Lorestan Province, Iran. At the 2006 census, its population was 82, in 18 families.

References 

Towns and villages in Khorramabad County